Vice Admiral Sir Leopold George Heath KCB (18 November 1817 – 7 May 1907) was a Royal Navy officer who went on to be Commander-in-Chief, East Indies Station.

Naval career
Heath joined the Royal Navy in 1830 and was involved in the capture of Borneo in 1846. He was beachmaster during the British landings at Eupatoria during the Crimean War and then became acting Captain of HMS Sans Pareil in the Black Sea before taking personal charge of the Port of Balaclava.
In 1846, as Lt Heath of HMS Iris, he drew a three- part depiction of the coasts of Hong Kong Island and Kowloon. His drawings were published by the Hydrographer's Office, London, in 1847 as a guide for merchant ships' captains. The series was republished in 1997 to mark the end of the 99-year lease by Britain of Hong Kong's New Territories.

Heath later commanded HMS Seahorse, HMS Melampus, HMS Arrogant, HMS Dauntless and then HMS Cambridge. He was appointed vice-president of the Ordnance Select Committee at Woolwich in 1863 and Commander-in-Chief, East Indies Station in 1867 and the following year took charge of the naval aspects of the Expedition to Abyssinia. He served on a committee for torpedo defence in 1870 and retired in 1877.

In retirement Heath lived at Anstie Grange in Holmwood (Surrey), where he died. He became a Director of the Hand in Hand Fire & Life Insurance Society, of the Central Bank of London and of the Eastern and South African Telegraph Company. In 1897 he published Letters from the Black Sea during the Crimean War, 1854-55.

Family
Heath married at St. Paul's Church, Malta, on 8 December 1853 to Mary Emma Marsh, daughter of Cuthbert Marsh, of Eastbury, Hertfordshire. Lady Heath died aged 76 at Anstie Grange, Holmwood, on 20 December 1902. They had issue seven children who survived them:
Arthur Raymond Heath (1854-1943), married Flora Jean Baxter
Marion Emma (1856-1949), married firstly Alfred Fox Cotton, secondly Major Ralph Martin Crofton
Frederick Crofton Heath, later Heath-Caldwell (1858-1945), Major-General British Army, married Constance Mary Helsham Helsham-Jones
Cuthbert Eden Heath (1859-1939), married Sarah Caroline Gore Gambier
Ada Randolf (1860-1957), married H.J.T. Broadwood (1856-1911)
Sir Herbert Leopold Heath (1861-1954), Admiral Royal Navy, married Elizabeth Catherine Simpson
Sir Gerard Moore Heath (1863-1929), Major-General British Army, married Mary Egerton.

References

Sources

External links
 
 Biography of Adm Sir Leopold George Heath - JJ Heath-Caldwell family history website

1817 births
1907 deaths
Royal Navy vice admirals
Knights Commander of the Order of the Bath
Royal Navy personnel of the Crimean War